Stenoglene sulphureoides is a moth in the family Eupterotidae. It was described by Lars Kühne in 2007. It is found in Kenya.

References

Endemic moths of Kenya
Moths described in 2007
Janinae